Jair Picerni (born October 20, 1944) is a Brazilian football manager and former player, who played as a right back.

With São Caetano, Picerni was twice runner-up of the Campeonato Brasileiro Série A (2000 and 2001) and a Copa Libertadores (2002).

Honours
São Caetano
 Campeonato Paulista Série A2: 2000

Palmeiras
 Campeonato Brasileiro Série B: 2003

References

External links
 sambafoot 

1944 births
Living people
Brazilian footballers
Brazilian football managers
Expatriate football managers in Portugal
Campeonato Brasileiro Série A managers
Campeonato Brasileiro Série B managers
Comercial Futebol Clube (Ribeirão Preto) players
Guarani FC players
Associação Atlética Ponte Preta players
Associação Atlética Ponte Preta managers
Associação Atlética Internacional (Limeira) managers
Esporte Clube Santo André managers
Sport Club Corinthians Paulista managers
Associação Portuguesa de Desportos managers
Al Ain FC managers
Sport Club do Recife managers
Botafogo Futebol Clube (SP) managers
C.D. Nacional managers
União São João Esporte Clube managers
União Agrícola Barbarense Futebol Clube managers
Sociedade Esportiva do Gama managers
Associação Desportiva São Caetano managers
Guarani FC managers
Sociedade Esportiva Palmeiras managers
Clube Atlético Mineiro managers
Esporte Clube Bahia managers
Fortaleza Esporte Clube managers
Brasiliense Futebol Clube managers
Red Bull Brasil managers
Association football defenders
Brazilian expatriate football managers
Brazilian expatriate sportspeople in Portugal
Brazilian expatriate sportspeople in the United Arab Emirates
Expatriate football managers in the United Arab Emirates
Footballers from São Paulo